Design District may refer to:
 Charlotte Design District
 Dallas Design District
 Calgary Design District
 Miami Design District
 Orlando Design District
 San Francisco's Design District